Andrey Vladimirovich Kolesnikov is a Russian journalist, an author of a series of books about Anatoly Chubais.

He worked in Izvestia, and since 1988 he had been a deputy editor of The New Times (Russia). He is also a columnist for Vedomosti.

Biography 
Born to a family of lawyers. Graduated from the Moscow State Faculty of Law юридический факультет МГУ (1987).

 1987—1990 — senior consultant of the judicial committee of criminal cases of the Supreme Court of the Russian Federation.
 1990—1992 — journalist for «Диалог».
 1992—1993 — journalist «Российские вести».
 1993—1995 — journalist «Огонёк».

From 1995 — works for the «Новое время» — The New Times: journalist, deputy editor, from January 1998

From 1998 — works for the newspaper «Известия»: from June — September 1998 — editor of the economics department; in September 1998 — January 2000 — editor of politics; from January 2000 — political journalist

20 days after Vladimir Putin took over the presidency from Boris Yeltsin, and thus before he was elected, Kolesnikov compared Putin with Mussolini.

Kolesnikov remained a fierce critic of the system that Putin established.

He was awarded with national prizes Adam Smith.

His brother, Sergey Kolesnikov, was a Kremlin speechwriter.

Bibliography 
 Guliev V. E., Kolesnikov А. В. Отчуждённое государство: проблемы политического и правового отчуждения в современной России. — «Манускрипт», 1998 (2-е издание — 2004). — 214 с.
 Andrei Kolesnikov, Alexander Privalov. New Russian Ideology. Хроника политических мифов. 1999—2000. —  Издательство ГУ ВШЭ, 2001. — 364 с. — 3000 экз. — 
 Andrei Kolesnikov. Neizvestnyi Chubais: Stranitsy Biografii, 2003, 
 Andrei Kolesnikov.
 Andrey Kolesnikov. Anatoliy Chubais. Biography. — «АСТ», «АСТ Москва», 2008. — 384 с. — 7000 экз. — , 
 (2007) "Спичрайтеры" (Speechwriters), about Kremlin speechwriters.

References 

1965 births
Living people
Journalists from Moscow
Academic staff of the Higher School of Economics
The Moscow Times